Ferenc Szusza (1 December 1923 – 1 August 2006) was a Hungarian footballer who played as a forward. He was a top division player for Újpest FC from 1941 to 1960. He made 24 appearances for the Hungary national team and was a four-time champion with Újpest FC.

Career
As of 2021, Szusza was the all-time second-top scorer in Hungary's top division, and the 11th highest among all top division players in the world.

Szusza played for Hungary, but was a surprise omission from the side that won gold at the 1952 Summer Olympics. He was disciplined by then manager Gusztáv Sebes after an incident following a match against the Soviet Union in Moscow in May 1952. Szusza would only make one further appearance for Hungary, in 1956.

After his football career, Szusza became a manager. He coached Győri ETO, Újpesti Dózsa, Górnik Zabrze, Real Betis and Atlético Madrid.

Carrer Statistics

Legacy
Újpest FC's stadium, Szusza Ferenc Stadium, is named after Szusza.

Honours
Újpest
 Hungarian League: 1945 Spring, 1945–46, 1946–47, 1959–60

Hungary
 Balkan Cup Champions: 1947

Individual
 Hungarian Football Federation Player of the Year: 1947

See also 
 List of men's footballers with 500 or more goals

References

External links
 IFFHS link

Hungarian footballers
1923 births
2006 deaths
Hungarian football managers
Hungarian expatriate football managers
Hungary international footballers
Újpest FC players
Győri ETO FC managers
Újpest FC managers
Górnik Zabrze managers
Real Betis managers
Atlético Madrid managers
People from Újpest
Expatriate football managers in Poland
Hungarian expatriate sportspeople in Poland
Association football forwards
Nemzeti Bajnokság I managers
Footballers from Budapest